Thomas Wynn may refer to:

 Thomas Wynn, 1st Baron Newborough (1736–1807), British politician
 Thomas Wynn, 2nd Baron Newborough (1802–1832), British peer
 Thomas A. Wynn, immunologist
 Thomas G. Wynn, cognitive archaeologist
 Sir Thomas Wynn, 1st Baronet, Welsh politician